013NEWS is a South African provincial online newspaper, published by Mfiso Media in Mpumalanga. It was founded on 1 August 2016 to focus on Mpumalanga news, politics, government, local lifestyle and business. The site is developed by the Southern Sons Group.

The paper was named 2020's best Mpumalanga newspaper by MEA Markets during their African Excellence Awards

References

External links
 Official website
 013News Mpumalanga - Portfolio

Daily newspapers published in South Africa
South African companies established in 2016
Mass media companies of South Africa
Mass media companies established in 2016
Mass media in Mpumalanga